The 1938 United States Senate election in North Dakota took place on November 8, 1938. Incumbent Republican Senator Gerald Nye ran for re-election to his third term. He faced a strong challenge in the Republican primary from colorful Governor William Langer, but narrowly won renomination. Langer subsequently ran as an independent against Nye in the general election, and won the endorsement of the Nonpartisan League. The contest effectively sidelined Democratic nominee J. J. Nygaard, and the contest between Nye and Langer devolved into sharp disagreements about the United States's foreign affairs. Nye ultimately defeated Langer by a wide margin—winning 50% of the vote to Langer's 43%—but significantly reduced from his 1932 and 1926 landslides.

Democratic Primary

Candidates
 J. J. Nygaard, 1936 Democratic congressional candidate
 Halvor L. Halvorson, perennial candidate
 B. A. Johansson

Results

Republican Primary

Candidates
 Gerald Nye, incumbent U.S. Senator
 William Langer, Governor of North Dakota

Results

General election

Results

References

1938
North Dakota
United States Senate